The Batik Arowana (Scleropages inscriptus), is a large, bony-tongued fish native to Myanmar. The species is found in the Tanintharyi River basin on the Indian Ocean coast of peninsular Myanmar.

This species is differentiated from other members of Scleropages by the wavy pattern present on the scales and head of the fish similar to Batik textiles.

Past records indicate that the fish was a fairly commonly consumed fish in the region. However it is claimed to be extinct in the wild due to overharvesting for the aquarium trade.

See also
List of freshwater aquarium fish species

References

Osteoglossidae
Endemic fauna of Myanmar
Fish of Myanmar
Fish described in 2012